Miroslaw (Mirek) Vitali, OBE (October 5, 1914 in Human, Russian Empire – February 19, 1992 in London, England) was a physician specialising in treatment and care of amputees. He was awarded the Order of the British Empire in 1986 in recognition of his outstanding work helping British servicemen who lost limbs in World War II.

Biography
He was born to Polish parents in Human in the Russian Empire.  He completed studies at the Medical University of Warsaw in 1939. Taken prisoner during the German offensive in September, 1939, he escaped and returned to Warsaw, where he became active in the underground movement while working in the orthopedic department of the Red Cross hospital. During the 1944 Warsaw Rising he managed a field hospital. After seven months as prisoner of war in Stalag IV-B he made his way to England via the Polish II Corps in Italy.

Shortly after he was demobilised in 1948, Vitali was appointed orthopedic registrar at Queen Mary's Hospital in Roehampton and commenced his lifelong work with amputees and developing improved artificial limbs. Vitali was elected a Fellow of the Royal College of Surgeons in 1963. In 1968 he became principal medical officer for prosthetic research at the hospital. After his retirement in 1979 he continued as a consultant for Queen Mary's Hospital, Westminster Hospital and the Royal National Orthopaedic Hospital. On behalf of the British Council he travelled all over the world, giving lectures and instructional courses to help improve the quality of prosthetic care and fitting of artificial limbs in many countries. He was trustee and adviser for the Douglas Bader Centre at Queen Mary's Hospital. In the 1980s, the Polish government awarded him the Order of Polonia Restituta in recognition of his work with prosthetics, and the Cross of Valour (Krzyz Walecznych) for his bravery in the Warsaw Rising. In 1986, he was made an Officer of the Order of the British Empire (OBE), in recognition of his work for wounded British soldiers.

He was co-author of a major textbook Amputations and Prostheses, published in London in 1978 and translated into many languages.

References

General references
 Biography of Dr. Vitali
 Obituary in the London "Times", March 5, 1992

Specific references

External links
Obituary in the Annals of the Royal College of Surgeons

Polish orthopaedic surgeons
1914 births
1992 deaths
People from Uman
British orthopaedic surgeons
Officers of the Order of the British Empire
Recipients of the Order of Polonia Restituta
Recipients of the Cross of Valour (Poland)
Warsaw Uprising insurgents
Fellows of the Royal College of Surgeons
20th-century surgeons
Polish emigrants to the United Kingdom